The 2014–15 Arkansas Razorbacks women's basketball team represents the University of Arkansas in the 2014–15 college basketball season. The Razorbacks, led by first-year head coach Jimmy Dykes, play their games at Bud Walton Arena and were members of the Southeastern Conference. They finished the season 18–14, 6–10 in SEC play to finish in a tie for ninth place. They advanced to the quarterfinals of the SEC women's tournament where they lost to South Carolina. They received an at-large bid to the NCAA women's tournament where defeated Northwestern in the first round before losing to Baylor in the second round.

Roster

Rankings

Schedule

|-
!colspan=9 style="background:#C41E3A; color:#FFFFFF;"| Exhibition

|-
!colspan=9 style="background:#C41E3A; color:#FFFFFF;"| Non-conference regular season

|-
!colspan=9 style="background:#C41E3A; color:#FFFFFF;"| SEC regular season

|-
!colspan=9 style="background:#C41E3A;"| SEC Women's Tournament

|-
!colspan=12 style="background:#C41E3A;"| NCAA Women's Tournament

See also
2014–15 Arkansas Razorbacks men's basketball team

References

Arkansas
Arkansas Razorbacks women's basketball seasons
Arkansas
Arkansas Razor
Arkansas Razor